Dillon School District Four is a school district headquartered in Dillon, South Carolina. The district has over 4,000 students in nine schools.

Schools
 Lake View High School (6-12)
 Dillon High School (9-12)
 Dillon Middle School (6-8)
 Elementary schools
 Pre K-5
 Lake View Elementary School
 4-5
 Gordon Elementary School
 Pre K-3
 East Elementary School
 South Elementary School
 Stewart Heights Elementary School

References

External links

School districts in South Carolina
Education in Dillon County, South Carolina